John Day (born 13 September 1948) is an English Old Testament scholar. He held the Title of Distinction of Professor of Old Testament Studies in the Faculty of Theology at the University of Oxford (2004–13). He is the editor of In Search of Pre-Exilic Israel (2004) and wrote God's Conflict with the Dragon and the Sea (1985), Yahweh and the Gods and Goddesses of Canaan (2000), and From Creation to Babel: Studies in Genesis 1–11 (2013). He was Fellow, Tutor in Theology, and Dean of Degrees at Lady Margaret Hall.

He was elected to an emeritus fellowship at Lady Margaret Hall in 2013.

Works

Books

References 

 Lady Margaret Hall
 Debrett's Biography

External links 
 Lady Margaret Hall

1948 births
20th-century Christian biblical scholars
21st-century Christian biblical scholars
English biblical scholars
English male non-fiction writers
Fellows of Lady Margaret Hall, Oxford
Living people
Old Testament scholars
Religion academics
Presidents of the Society for Old Testament Study